= Kilometrage =

Kilometrage may refer to:

- A distance measured in kilometres.
  - Distance traveled, typically as measured by an odometer, optionally from a distance marker.
- Fuel economy in automobiles, typically in miles per gallon (mpg) (US) or liters per 100 kilometers (l/100 km)
